In Japanese folklore,  are foxes that possess paranormal abilities that increase as they get older and wiser. According to yōkai folklore, all foxes have the ability to shapeshift into human form. While some folktales speak of  employing this ability to trick others—as foxes in folklore often do—other stories portray them as faithful guardians, friends, and lovers.

Foxes and humans lived close together in ancient Japan; this companionship gave rise to legends about the creatures.  have become closely associated with Inari, a Shinto  or spirit, and serve as its messengers. This role has reinforced the fox's supernatural significance. The more tails a  has—they may have as many as nine—the older, wiser, and more powerful it is. Because of their potential power and influence, some people make sacrifices to them as to a deity.

Conversely foxes were often seen as "witch animals", especially during the 
Edo period (1603–1867), and were thought of as goblins who could not be trusted (similar to some badgers and cats).

Origins

The oldest relationship between the Japanese people and the fox dates back to the Jomon period necklace made by piercing the canine teeth and jawbone of the fox.

In Nihon Shoki, which was compiled in 720 and is one of the oldest history books in Japan, foxes appeared for the first time as supernatural beings that let people know good omens and bad omens. Various legends about foxes with human personalities were first described in Nihon Ryōiki which was compiled around 822. Also, their descendants are depicted as doing evil things by taking advantage of their power.

According to Hiroshi Moriyama, a professor at the Tokyo University of Agriculture, foxes have come to be regarded as sacred by the Japanese because they are the natural enemies of rats that eat up rice or burrow into rice paddies. Because fox urine has a rat-repelling effect, Japanese people placed a stone with fox urine on a hokora of a Shinto shrine set up near a rice field. In this way, it is assumed that people in Japan acquired the culture of respecting  as messengers of Inari Okami.

Folktales from China tell of fox spirits called  also named as nine tale fox (）that may have up to nine tails.

Smyers (1999) notes that the idea of the fox as seductress and the connection of the fox myths to Buddhism were introduced into Japanese folklore through similar Chinese stories, but she maintains that some fox stories contain elements unique to Japan.

Etymology

The full etymology is unknown. The oldest known usage of the word is in the text Shin'yaku Kegonkyō Ongi Shiki, dating to 794. Other old sources include Nihon Ryōiki (810–824) and Wamyō Ruijushō (c. 934). Following several diachronic phonological changes, this became .

Many etymological suggestions have been made, though there is no general agreement:
Myōgoki (1268) suggests that it is so called because it is "always yellow".
The early Kamakura-period  indicates that it means "came [perfective aspect particle tsu] to bedroom", from a legend that a  could take a human woman form, marry a man, and bear children.
 Nozaki also suggests that the word was originally onomatopoetic:  represented a fox's yelp and came to be the general word for 'fox';  signified an affectionate mood.

A widely known folk etymology of the word relates to sleeping and returning home: in classical Japanese,  means 'come and sleep', and  means 'always comes'.  This appears to be tied to a specific story; it is one of the oldest surviving  tales, and unlike most of those in which a  takes the form of a human woman and marries men, this one does not end tragically.  From Hamel's translation:

The folk etymology would have it that because the fox returns to her husband each night as a woman but leaves each morning as a fox she is called .

Characteristics

 are believed to possess superior intelligence, long life, and magical powers. The word  is sometimes translated as 'fox spirit', which is actually a broader folkloric category. This does not mean that  are ghosts, nor that they are fundamentally different from regular foxes. Because the word spirit is used to reflect a state of knowledge or enlightenment, all long-lived foxes were believed to gain supernatural abilities.

There are two common classifications of :

 The  are benevolent, celestial foxes associated with Inari; they are sometimes simply called Inari foxes in English.
 On the other hand, the  tend to be mischievous or even malicious.

Local traditions add further types.

 have as many as nine tails. Generally, a greater number of tails indicates an older and more powerful ; in fact, some folktales say that a fox will only grow additional tails after it has lived 100 years. (In the wild, the typical lifespan of a real fox is one to three years, although individuals may live up to ten years in captivity.) One, five, seven, and nine tails are the most common numbers in folktales. These  gain the abilities to see and hear anything happening anywhere in the world. Other tales credit them with infinite wisdom (omniscience).

Foxes

A  may take on human form, an ability learned when it reaches a certain age—usually 100 years, although some tales say 50. As a common prerequisite for the transformation, the fox must place reeds, a leaf, or a skull over its head. Common forms assumed by  include beautiful women, young girls, elderly men, and less often young boys. These shapes are not limited by the fox's own age or gender, and a  can duplicate the appearance of a specific person.  are particularly renowned for impersonating beautiful women. ('fox-faced') refers to human females who have a narrow face with close-set eyes, thin eyebrows, and high cheekbones. Traditionally, this facial structure is considered attractive, and some tales ascribe it to foxes in human form. Variants on the theme have the  retain other foxy traits, such as a coating of fine hair, a fox-shaped shadow, or a reflection that shows its true form.

In some stories,  retain—and have difficulty hiding—their tails when they take human form; looking for the tail, perhaps when the fox gets drunk or careless, is a common method of discerning the creature's true nature. A particularly devout individual may even be able to see through a fox's disguise merely by perceiving them.  can also be exposed while in human form by their fear and hatred of dogs, and some become so rattled by their presence that they revert to the form of a fox and flee.

One folktale illustrating these imperfections in the 's human shape concerns Koan, a historical person later credited with legendary wisdom and magical powers of divination. According to the story, he was staying at the home of one of his devotees when he scalded his foot entering a bath because the water had been drawn too hot. Then, "in his pain, he ran out of the bathroom naked. When the people of the household saw him, they were astonished to see that Koan had fur covering much of his body, along with a fox's tail. Then Koan transformed in front of them, becoming an elderly fox and running away."

Other supernatural abilities commonly attributed to  include possession, generating fire or lightning, willful manifestation in the dreams of others, flight, invisibility, and the creation of illusions so elaborate as to be almost indistinguishable from reality. Other  have characteristics reminiscent of vampires or succubi, and feed on the life or spirit of human beings, generally through sexual contact.

Kitsunetsuki

, also written , literally means 'the state of being possessed by a fox'. The victim is usually said to be a young woman, whom the fox enters beneath her fingernails or through her breasts. In some cases, the victims' facial expressions are said to change in such a way that they resemble those of a fox. Japanese tradition holds that fox possession can cause illiterate victims to temporarily gain the ability to read. Though foxes in folklore can possess a person of their own will,  is often attributed to the malign intents of hereditary fox employers.

Folklorist Lafcadio Hearn describes the condition in Glimpses of Unfamiliar Japan:

He goes on to note that, once freed from the possession, the victim would never again be able to eat tofu, or other foods favored by foxes.

Attempting to rid someone of a fox spirit was done via an exorcism, often at an Inari shrine. If a priest was not available or if the exorcism failed, alleged victims of  might be badly burned or beaten in hopes of driving out the fox spirits. The whole family of someone thought to be possessed might be ostracized by their community.

In Japan,  was described as a disease as early as the Heian period and remained a common diagnosis for mental illness until the early 20th century. Possession was the explanation for the abnormal behavior displayed by the afflicted individuals. In the late 19th century, Shunichi Shimamura noted that physical diseases that caused fever were often considered . The superstition has lost favor, but stories of fox possession still occur, such as allegations that members of the Aum Shinrikyo cult had been possessed.

In modern psychiatry, the term  refers to a culture-bound syndrome unique to Japanese culture. Those who suffer from the condition believe they are possessed by a fox. Symptoms include cravings for rice or sweet adzuki beans, listlessness, restlessness, and aversion to eye contact.

Folk beliefs
In folk religion, stories of fox possession can be found in all lands of Japan. Those possessed by a fox are thought to suffer from a mental illness or similar condition.

These families are said to have been able to use their fox to gain fortune, but marriage into such a family was considered forbidden as it would enlarge the family. They are also said to be able to bring about illness and curse the possessions, crops, and livestock of ones that they hate, and as a result of being considered taboo by the other families, it has led to societal problems.

Some stories identify them as magical jewels or pearls. When not in human form or possessing a human, a kitsune keeps the ball in its mouth or carries it on its tail. Jewels are a common symbol of Inari and representations of sacred Inari foxes without them are rare.

One belief is that when a  changes shape, its  holds a portion of its magical power. Another tradition is that the pearl represents the kitsune's soul; the kitsune will die if separated from it for too long. For example, a 12th-century tale describes a man using a fox's  to secure a favor;

The fox later saves his life by leading him past a band of armed robbers.

Portrayal

Embedded in Japanese folklore as they are, kitsune appear in numerous Japanese works. Noh, kyogen, bunraku, and kabuki plays derived from folk tales feature them, as do contemporary works such as native animations, comic books and video games. Japanese metal idol band Babymetal refer to the kitsune myth in their lyrics and include the use of fox masks, hand signs, and animation interludes during live shows. Western authors of fiction have also made use of the kitsune legends although not in extensive detail.

Servants of Inari
Kitsune are associated with Inari, the Shinto deity of rice. This association has reinforced the fox's supernatural significance. Originally, kitsune were Inari's messengers, but the line between the two is now blurred so that Inari Ōkami may be depicted as a fox. Likewise, entire shrines are dedicated to kitsune, where devotees can leave offerings. Fox spirits are said to be particularly fond of a fried slice of tofu called abura-age, which is accordingly found in the noodle-based dishes kitsune udon and kitsune soba. Similarly, Inari-zushi is a type of sushi named for Inari Ōkami that consists of rice-filled pouches of fried tofu. There is speculation among folklorists as to whether another Shinto fox deity existed in the past. Foxes have long been worshipped as kami.

Inari's kitsune are white, a color of a good omen. They possess the power to ward off evil, and they sometimes serve as guardian spirits. In addition to protecting Inari shrines, they are petitioned to intervene on behalf of the locals and particularly to aid against troublesome nogitsune, those spirit foxes who do not serve Inari. Black foxes and nine-tailed foxes are likewise considered good omens.

According to beliefs derived from fusui (feng shui), the fox's power over evil is such that a mere statue of a fox can dispel the evil kimon, or energy, that flows from the northeast. Many Inari shrines, such as the famous Fushimi Inari shrine in Kyoto, feature such statues, sometimes large numbers of them.

Kitsune are connected to the Buddhist religion through the Dakiniten, goddesses conflated with Inari's female aspect. Dakiniten is depicted as a female boddhisattva wielding a sword and riding a flying white fox.

Tricksters

Kitsune are often presented as tricksters, with motives that vary from mischief to malevolence. Stories tell of kitsune playing tricks on overly proud samurai, greedy merchants, and boastful commoners, while the crueler ones abuse poor tradesmen and farmers or devout Buddhist monks. Their victims are usually men; women are possessed instead. For example, kitsune are thought to employ their kitsunebi to lead travelers astray in the manner of a will-o'-the-wisp. Another tactic is for the kitsune to confuse its target with illusions or visions. Other common goals of trickster kitsune include seduction, theft of food, humiliation of the prideful, or vengeance for a perceived slight.

A traditional game called kitsune-ken ('fox-fist') references the kitsune's powers over human beings. The game is similar to rock paper scissors, but the three hand positions signify a fox, a hunter, and a village headman. The headman beats the hunter, whom he outranks; the hunter beats the fox, whom he shoots; the fox beats the headman, whom he bewitches.

This ambiguous portrayal, coupled with their reputation for vengefulness, leads people to try to discover a troublesome fox's motives. In one case, the 16th-century leader Toyotomi Hideyoshi wrote a letter to the kami Inari:

Kitsune keep their promises and strive to repay any favor. Occasionally a kitsune attaches itself to a person or household, where they can cause all sorts of mischief. In one story from the 12th century, only the homeowner's threat to exterminate the foxes convinces them to behave. The kitsune patriarch appears in the man's dreams:

Other kitsune use their magic for the benefit of their companion or hosts as long as the humans treat them with respect. As yōkai, however, kitsune do not share human morality, and a kitsune who has adopted a house in this manner may, for example, bring its host money or items that it has stolen from the neighbors. Accordingly, common households thought to harbor kitsune are treated with suspicion. Oddly, samurai families were often reputed to share similar arrangements with kitsune, but these foxes were considered zenko and the use of their magic a sign of prestige. Abandoned homes were common haunts for kitsune. One 12th-century story tells of a minister moving into an old mansion only to discover a family of foxes living there. They first try to scare him away, then claim that the house "has been ours for many years, and … we wish to register a vigorous protest." The man refuses, and the foxes resign themselves to moving to an abandoned lot nearby.

Tales distinguish kitsune gifts from kitsune payments. If a kitsune offers a payment or reward that includes money or material wealth, part or all of the sum will consist of old paper, leaves, twigs, stones, or similar valueless items under a magical illusion. True kitsune gifts are usually intangibles, such as protection, knowledge, or long life.

Wives and lovers
Kitsune are commonly portrayed as lovers, usually in stories involving a young human male and a kitsune who takes the form of a human woman. The kitsune may be a seductress, but these stories are more often romantic in nature. Typically, the young man unknowingly marries the fox, who proves a devoted wife. The man eventually discovers the fox's true nature, and the fox-wife is forced to leave him. In some cases, the husband wakes as if from a dream, filthy, disoriented, and far from home. He must then return to confront his abandoned family in shame.

Many stories tell of fox-wives bearing children. When such progeny are human, they possess special physical or supernatural qualities that often pass to their own children. The astrologer-magician Abe no Seimei was reputed to have inherited such extraordinary powers.

Other stories tell of kitsune marrying one another. Rain falling from a clear sky—a sunshower—is called kitsune no yomeiri or the kitsune's wedding, in reference to a folktale describing a wedding ceremony between the creatures being held during such conditions. The event is considered a good omen, but the kitsune will seek revenge on any uninvited guests, as is depicted in the 1990 Akira Kurosawa film Dreams.

Stephen Turnbull, in Nagashino 1575, relates the tale of the Takeda clan's involvement with a fox-woman. The warlord Takeda Shingen, in 1544, defeated in battle a lesser local warlord named Suwa Yorishige and drove him to suicide after a "humiliating and spurious" peace conference, after which Shingen forced marriage on Suwa Yorishige's beautiful 14-year-old daughter Lady Koi—Shingen's own niece. Shingen, Turnbull writes, "was so obsessed with the girl that his superstitious followers became alarmed and believed her to be an incarnation of the white fox-spirit of the Suwa Shrine, who had bewitched him in order to gain revenge." When their son Takeda Katsuyori proved to be a disastrous leader and led the clan to their devastating defeat at the battle of Nagashino, Turnbull writes, "wise old heads nodded, remembering the unhappy circumstances of his birth and his magical mother".

See also

 Fox spirit, a general overview about this being in East Asian folklore
  – a Chinese fox spirit
  – a Korean fox spirit
  – a Vietnamese fox spirit
 
 
 The Sacred Book of the Werewolf
 The Sandman: The Dream Hunters
 
 
 Wild fox koan

Notes

References

Further reading

External links